General Terry may refer to:

Alfred Terry (1827–1890), Union Army major general 
Henry Dwight Terry (1812–1869), Union Army brigadier general 
James L. Terry (born 1957), U.S. Army lieutenant general
Nathaniel Terry (1768–1844), Connecticut State Militia general
Roy M. Terry (1915–1988), U.S. Air Force major general
William Terry (congressman) (1824–1888), Confederate States Army brigadier general
William R. Terry (1827–1897), Confederate States Army brigadier general